The Los Angeles City Attorney is an elected official who serves as the city of Los Angeles' government's lawyer and as a criminal prosecutor for misdemeanor violations. The Los Angeles County District Attorney prosecutes felonies. The city attorney is elected for four years, and the city charter requires the city attorney to be a lawyer qualified to practice in the California courts for five years preceding their election. In addition the General Counsel Division of the office provides legal counsel for the city and represents it in civil actions.

List of Los Angeles city attorneys

Notes

References

External links
 Official website of the City Attorney

Government of Los Angeles

1850 establishments in California